Scott Edgar may refer to:

Tripod (band) member Scott Edgar
Scott Edgar (basketball), American basketball coach